Michael Schulte may refer to:

Michael Schulte (professor) (born 1963), German professor of Nordic linguistics in Norway
Michael Schulte (singer) (born 1990), German singer and songwriter